Greg Westlind (born August 31, 1948) is an American politician who has served in the North Dakota House of Representatives from the 15th district since 2016.

References

1948 births
Living people
Republican Party members of the North Dakota House of Representatives
21st-century American politicians